The Ogeechee River is a  blackwater river in the U.S. state of Georgia. It is one of the state's few free-flowing streams.

Course

The Ogeechee runs from the Piedmont across the Fall Line and Sandhills regions. There it flows across the coastal plain of Georgia to the Atlantic Ocean. From a shallow clear running stream with several shoals, rapids, and a small falls at Shoals, below Louisville the river becomes a lazy meandering channel through cypress swamps and miles of undeveloped forests.

Geology

Rocks
The Ogeechee River basin contains parts of the Piedmont and Coastal Plain physiographic provinces, which extend throughout the southeastern United States. This boundary follows the contact between older crystalline metamorphic rocks of the Piedmont Province and the younger unconsolidated Cretaceous and Tertiary sediments of the Coastal Plain Province. Other rock types found in the basin include metasedimentary rock, schists and phyllites, felsic and mafic metavolcanic rocks, and amphibolite. Coastal Plain sediments overlap the igneous and metamorphic rocks of the southern edge of the Piedmont Province at the Fall Line.

Soils
The Ogeechee River watershed in Georgia crosses four major land resource areas. About 6 percent of the area lies within the Southern Piedmont MLRA, about 4 percent in the Carolina and Georgia Sand Hills MLRA, 48 percent in the Southern Coastal Plain MLRA, and 42 percent in the Atlantic Coast Flatwoods MLRA. The dominant soils in this part of the watershed have 40 to 60 inches of sandy materials overlying a loamy subsoil. Soils in the Southern Coastal Plain part of the watershed are more variable than in other parts, especially concerning their textures and water table depths.

History
Paleo-Indian societies arrived in the area of the Ogeechee River around 11,500 years ago, and the river was settled for several centuries by the Mississippians and Yuchi until the arrival of Europeans. In fact, though the origin of the name "Ogeechee" is uncertain, it may be derived from a Muskogee term meaning "river of the Uchees", referring to the Yuchi people, who inhabited areas near it. Some scholars have drawn a connection between the river's name and the name Gullah Geechee for the Gullah people who inhabit coastal Georgia.

See also
 South Atlantic-Gulf Water Resource Region

References

Rivers of Georgia (U.S. state)
Rivers of Bryan County, Georgia
Rivers of Chatham County, Georgia